Matthew Ferguson (born 3 April 1973) is a Canadian former actor. He is known for his roles in On My Own (1991), Love and Human Remains (1993), Lilies (1996), and La Femme Nikita (1997–2001).

Life and career
Ferguson was born in Toronto, Ontario, Canada. He graduated from the Claude Watson School for the Arts.

Ferguson made his debut in theatre as "Morgan Moreen" in Geometry in Venice (1989), which garnered him a Dora Mavor Moore Award nomination as Best Featured Actor, then on screen as Simon Henderson in On My Own.

He is best known as "Seymour Birkoff", from the TV series La Femme Nikita (1997–2001).

His roles in movies such as Love and Human Remains (1993), Eclipse (1994) and Lilies (1996) gave him nominations at the Genie Awards in the 1990s.

Selected filmography

Film
 On My Own (1992) as Simon Henderson
 Love and Human Remains (1993) as Kane
 I Love a Man in Uniform (1993) as Edward Nichols
 The Club (1994) as Darren Spenser
 Life with Billy (1994) as Allan Whynot
 Lives of Girls and Women (1994) as Jerry Storey
 Spenser: Pale Kings and Princes (1994)
 Billy Madison (1995) as Tenth Grader
 Eclipse (1994) as Angelo
 Harrison Bergeron (1995) as Garth Bergeron
 The Deliverance of Elaine (1996)
 Lilies (1996) as Young Bilodeau
 The English Patient (1996) as Young Canadian Soldier
 Uncut (1997) as Peter Cort
 The Wall as (1998) Buelton
 Giving Up the Ghost (1998) as Matthew 'Bulldog' Phelps
 I Shout Love (2001) as Bobby
 Cube 2: Hypercube (2002) as Max Reisler
 Three and a Half (2002) as Sasha the Director
 Owning Mahowny (2003) as Martin

TV
 Street Legal (1992) as Mark (2 episodes)
 La Femme Nikita (1997–2001) as Seymour Birkoff/Jason Crawford (90 episodes)
 An American in Canada (2002–2004) as Derrick (5 episodes)
 Odd Job Jack (2003–2007) as Bobby Lee (voice) (52 episodes)

Selected bibliography
 Heyn, Christopher. "A Conversation with Matthew Ferguson." Inside Section One: Creating and Producing TV's La Femme Nikita. Introduction by Peta Wilson. Los Angeles: Persistence of Vision Press, 2006. 94–99. . In-depth conversation with Matthew Ferguson about his role as Birkoff on La Femme Nikita, as well as his early acting experiences.

Nominations
 2003 - ACTRA Toronto Awards: Outstanding Performance - Male for I Shout Love
 1998 - Gemini Awards: Best Performance by an Actor in a Featured Supporting Role in a Dramatic Series for La Femme Nikita
 1996 - Genie Awards: Best Performance by an Actor in a Leading Role for Lilies
 1996 - Genie Awards: Best Performance by an Actor in a Leading Role for Eclipse
 1994 - Genie Awards: Performance by an Actor in a Supporting Role for Love & Human Remains
 1993 - Australian Film Institute : Best Actor in a Leading Role for On My Own

References

External links

1973 births
Living people
Male actors from Toronto
Canadian male television actors
Canadian male film actors
Canadian male voice actors
Canadian people of Scottish descent